Berke Saka (born 9 July 2003) is a Turkish male swimmer competing in the backstroke event.

Career
Saka is a member of Galatasaray Swimming.  He broke the 13-years old national record of Derya Büyükuncu in the 200 m backstroke event with 1:58.08. He set a national record in the 200 metres individual medley event for 17-18 age class with 2:01.58 at the 2020 European Aquatics Championships  in Budapest, Hungary. He won the silver medal in the 200 m backstroke event with 2:01.62 and the bronze medal in the 200 m individual medley event with 2:03.25 at the 2019 European Youth Summer Olympic Festival in Baku, Azerbaycan. He won the gold medal in the 200 m individual medley, the silver medal in the 200 m backstroke   event of the 2021 European Junior Swimming Championships in Rome, Italy.

He obtained a quota for participation at the 2020 Summer Olympics. Saka was the flag bearer for Turkey together with Merve Tuncel at the 2020 Summer Olympics opening ceremony.

References

2003 births
Living people
Turkish male backstroke swimmers
Turkish male medley swimmers
Galatasaray Swimming swimmers
Swimmers at the 2020 Summer Olympics
Olympic swimmers of Turkey
Georgia Tech Yellow Jackets men's swimmers
21st-century Turkish people
Mediterranean Games medalists in swimming
Mediterranean Games bronze medalists for Turkey
Swimmers at the 2022 Mediterranean Games
Islamic Solidarity Games competitors for Turkey
Islamic Solidarity Games medalists in swimming